Iʿtikāf (also i'tikaaf or e'tikaaf) is an Islamic practice consisting of a period of staying in a mosque for a certain number of days, devoting oneself to ibadah during these days and staying away from worldly affairs. 

The literal meaning of the word suggests sticking and adhering to, or being regular in something. It is particularly popular among devout Muslims during the last 10 days of Ramadan, during which one secludes oneself in a part of the mosque and spends all one's time to worshiping.

See also
 Ali ibn Abi Talib
The White Days

References

 Ramadan Itikaf: A Guide to Maximizing Your Spiritual Experience 

Arabic words and phrases
Islamic terminology
Islamic worship
Ramadan